IFK Malmö Bandy is the Bandy department of the sports club IFK Malmö. IFK plays in the Division 2 Västra Götaland league which is in the third level of the Swedish bandy league system.  They play their home games at Sjöaltsvallen.

External links
 Official club website

Bandy clubs in Sweden
Sport in Malmö
Bandy
Bandy clubs established in 1899
1899 establishments in Sweden